Scanlan is an Irish surname that derives from the Irish Gaelic name Ó Scannláin, meaning descendant of Scannlán’. Notable people with the surname include:

Emmett J. Scanlan (born 1979), Irish actor
Fred Scanlan  (1877–1950), Canadian ice hockey player
Jerry Scanlan (born 1957) retired American football player
Joanna Scanlan (born 1961), English actress and television writer
John Joseph Scanlan (1906–1997), second Bishop of the Roman Catholic Diocese of Honolulu
Joseph Lawrence Scanlan (born 1929), American television director
Julian Scanlan (born 1997), American DJ
Luke Scanlan (1841–1915), American politician and farmer
Michael Scanlan (disambiguation)
Neal Scanlan (born 1961), British special effects artist 
Patricia Scanlan (born 1956), Irish novelist 
Reggie Scanlan, bass guitar player from New Orleans, Louisiana
Robert Richard Scanlan (1801–1876), Irish painter
Sean Scanlan (1948–2017), Scottish actor
Seán Scanlan (1937–2017), Irish pioneer in circuits & systems theory, electronic engineering professor 
Teresa Scanlan (1993), Irish American former Miss America and business lawyer 
Thomas Scanlan (1874–1930), Irish politician
Toni Scanlan (born 1956), Australian actress
Tuna Scanlan, Samoan/New Zealand boxer of the 1950s and '60s
 Walter Scanlan, stage name of Walter Van Brunt (1892–1971), American tenor
William J. Scanlan (1934–2014), musical theatre performer and composer

Fictional characters:
Mike Scanlan, a character in Arthur Conan Doyle's The Valley of Fear

See also
 Scanlan (disambiguation)
 Scanlon, a surname

References 

Anglicised Irish-language surnames